Luzula luzuloides, the white wood-rush or oakforest wood-rush is a species of flowering plant in the family Juncaceae (rush family). It is native to Central Europe, from the Balkans to Fennoscandia, but it has also been introduced to the British Isles and other parts of Europe, and to the north-eastern United States and eastern Canada.

References

External links

luzuloides
Flora of Central Europe
Flora of Northern Europe
Flora of Southeastern Europe
Plants described in 1789